Cinderella is a 1947 Soviet fairy tale musical film by Lenfilm studios.

Cast
 Yanina Zhejmo as Cinderella
 Aleksey Konsovsky as Prince
 Erast Garin as King
 Faina Ranevskaya as Cinderella's stepmother
 Yelena Yunger as Anna, 1st daughter
 Tamara Sezenyovskaya Marijana, 2nd daughter
 Vasili Merkuryev as Forester
 Aleksandr Rumnyov as Pas de Trois
 Varvara Myasnikova as Fairy
 Igor Klemenkov as Page
 Sergey Filippov as Corporal

External links

1947 films
Films based on Charles Perrault's Cinderella
Lenfilm films
1940s musical fantasy films
1940s Russian-language films
Films based on works by Evgeny Shvarts
Russian children's fantasy films
Soviet fantasy films
Films directed by Nadezhda Kosheverova
Soviet musical films
Soviet children's films